This is a list of articles holding galleries of maps of present-day countries and dependencies. The list includes all countries listed in the List of countries, the French overseas departments, the Spanish and Portuguese overseas regions and inhabited overseas dependencies.

 See List of extinct countries, empires, etc. and Former countries in Europe after 1815 for articles about countries that are no longer in existence.
 See List of countries for other articles and lists on countries.

See also
 Portal:Atlas
 Lists by country

Maps